July 12 - Eastern Orthodox Church calendar - July 14

All fixed commemorations below are celebrated on July 26 by Old Calendar.

For July 13th, Orthodox Churches on the Old Calendar commemorate the Saints listed on June 30.

Saints
 Synaxis of the Holy Archangel Gabriel.
 Martyr Serapion, under Severus (c. 205)  (see also: July 12)
 Martyr Marcian of Iconium (258)  (see also: July 11)
 Venerable Abbess Sarah of Scetis (370)
 Martyr Golinduc, in holy baptism Mary, of Persia (591)  (see also: July 12)
 Venerable Stephen the Sabaite (Stephen the Hymnographer) (794 or 807)

Pre-Schism Western saints
 Saint Julian of Le Mans, Bishop of Cenomanis (Le Mans) in (Gaul) (1st or 3rd century) (see also: January 27 - West)
 Saint Dogfan (Doewan), martyred by heathen in Dyfed in Wales where a church was dedicated to him (5th century)
 Saint Just of Penwith, monk, of Cornwall (5th century)
 Saints Eugene, Bishop of Carthage, Salutaris, Archdeacon of Carthage, Muritta the Deacon, and Companions, Confessors (505)
 Venerable Abbess Mildred of Thanet, Abbess of Minster-in-Thanet Convent (c. 733) (see also: February 20)
 Saint Turiaf of Dol (Turiav, Turiavus), successor of St. Samson as Bishop of Dol in Brittany (c. 750)

Post-Schism Orthodox saints
 The holy Five Martyrs of Alamannia who suffered in Cyprus: 
 Heliophotus, Epaphrodites, Ammon, Auxouthenius, and Euthenius, monks, of Cyprus (12th century)
 Saint Onesiphorus, born in Constantinople, ascetic in Cyprus and Wonderworker.

Other commemorations
 Icon of the Most Holy Theotokos "Axion Estin" ("It is Truly Meet").  (see also: June 11)
 Translation of the relics (early 11th century) of St. Juthwara of Cornwal (6th century) to Sherborne Abbey.
 Synaxis of the Saints of Hilandar, Mt. Athos.
 Repose of Constantine Oprisan of Jilava, Romania (1959)

Icon gallery

Notes

References

Sources
 July 13/July 26. Orthodox Calendar (PRAVOSLAVIE.RU).
 July 26 / July 13. HOLY TRINITY RUSSIAN ORTHODOX CHURCH (A parish of the Patriarchate of Moscow).
 July 13. OCA - The Lives of the Saints.
 July 13. The Year of Our Salvation - Holy Transfiguration Monastery, Brookline, Massachusetts. 
 The Autonomous Orthodox Metropolia of Western Europe and the Americas (ROCOR). St. Hilarion Calendar of Saints for the year of our Lord 2004. St. Hilarion Press (Austin, TX). p. 51.
 The Thirteenth Day of the Month of July. Orthodoxy in China.
 July 13. Latin Saints of the Orthodox Patriarchate of Rome.
 The Roman Martyrology. Transl. by the Archbishop of Baltimore. Last Edition, According to the Copy Printed at Rome in 1914. Revised Edition, with the Imprimatur of His Eminence Cardinal Gibbons. Baltimore: John Murphy Company, 1916. pp. 205–206.
 Rev. Richard Stanton. A Menology of England and Wales, or, Brief Memorials of the Ancient British and English Saints Arranged According to the Calendar, Together with the Martyrs of the 16th and 17th Centuries. London: Burns & Oates, 1892. pp. 332–334.
Greek Sources
 Great Synaxaristes:  13 ΙΟΥΛΙΟΥ. ΜΕΓΑΣ ΣΥΝΑΞΑΡΙΣΤΗΣ.
  Συναξαριστής. 13 Ιουλίου. ECCLESIA.GR. (H ΕΚΚΛΗΣΙΑ ΤΗΣ ΕΛΛΑΔΟΣ). 
  13/07/2018. Ορθόδοξος Συναξαριστής. 
Russian Sources
  26 июля (13 июля). Православная Энциклопедия под редакцией Патриарха Московского и всея Руси Кирилла (электронная версия). (Orthodox Encyclopedia - Pravenc.ru).
  13 июля по старому стилю / 26 июля по новому стилю. СПЖ "Союз православных журналистов". 2018.
  13 июля (ст.ст.) 26 июля 2014 (нов. ст.). Русская Православная Церковь Отдел внешних церковных связей. (DECR).

July in the Eastern Orthodox calendar